Cecilia Zandalasini (born 16 March 1996) is an Italian basketball player for Virtus Bologna of the Italian LBF and the Italian national team. She was the MVP of 2016 FIBA Europe Under-20 Championship for Women.

Early life 
Zandalasini was born on 16 March 1996 in Broni, Italy. She is the daughter of Roberto Zandalasini and Paola Lombardi. While playing with Geas Basket, she won six Italian youth club championships.

Professional career

Geas Basket (2013–14) 

At the age of 17, Zandalasini played as a guard under Geas Basket for the 2013–14 season. She led the team in points with a total of 314 across 20 games (15.7 PPG).

PF Schio (2014–2018) 
Zandalasini has played with PF Schio since 2014. In Zandalasini's third season with the team in 2016–17, the team won the Coppa Italia and reached the Serie A1 playoff finals. The team continued to the EuroLeague postseason, where Zandalasini had a team high 13.5 PPG.

EuroBasket 
At EuroBasket Women 2017 she averaged 19.0 points (2nd in event) and 9.6 rebounds (3rd in event) and earned a spot on the All-Tournament Team. Jeff Taylor of FIBA.com called her performance "the greatest FIBA EuroBasket Women debut of all time".

Minnesota Lynx (2017–present) 
With only three games left in their 2017 regular season, the Minnesota Lynx signed Zandalasini as an unrestricted free agent on 28 August 2017. Zandalasini was only able to play 18:37 of the remainder of the regular season and 11 during the playoffs, which the Lynx won.

On 7 February 2018 it was announced that the Lynx would re-sign Zandalasini for the 2018 season. Zandalasini became a breakout player during the season after a buzzer-beating play against the New York Liberty in their 16 June game. She has subsequently seen more minutes of play, establishing herself as a fit for the sixth woman role.

Zandalasini did not play with the Lynx during their 2019 season due to her international team commitments and an ankle injury.

On 29 February 2020 the Lynx announced they would re-sign Zandalasini for the 2020 season in a non-disclosed deal. However she did not play any games for the Lynx during the shortened 2020 season.

Fenerbahçe (2018–2021) 
On 4 July 2018 she had signed a two-year deal with the Turkish women's basketball club, Fenerbahçe.

Virtus Bologna (2021–present) 
On 5 May 2021 Zandalasini signed a two-year deal with the Italian women's basketball club Virtus Bologna.

WNBA career statistics

Regular season

|-
|style="text-align:left;background:#afe6ba;"| 2017†
| align="left" | Minnesota
| 3 || 0 || 6.3 || .250 || .000 || .000 || 0.3 || 0.0 || 0.0 || 0.0 || 0.7 || 0.7
|-
| align="left" | 2018
| align="left" | Minnesota
| 29 || 6 || 16.5 || .409 || .383 || .840 || 1.9 || 1.1 || 0.3 || 0.0 || 1.1 || 5.7
|-
| align="left" | Career
| align="left" | 2 years, 1 team
| 32 || 6 || 15.5 || .405 || .383 || .840 || 1.7 || 1.0 || 0.3 || 0.0 || 1.0 || 5.3

Playoffs

|-
|style="text-align:left;background:#afe6ba;"| 2017†
| align="left" | Minnesota
| 5 || 0 || 2.2 || 1.000 || .000 || .000 || 0.0 || 0.2 || 0.0 || 0.0 || 0.0 || 0.4
|-
| align="left" | 2018
| align="left" | Minnesota
| 1 || 1 || 25.0 || .250 || .333 || .000 || 1.0 || 0.0 || 1.0 || 1.0 || 2.0 || 3.0
|-
| align="left" | Career
| align="left" | 2 years, 1 team
| 6 || 1 || 6.0 || .400 || .333 || .000 || 0.2 || 0.2 || 0.2 || 0.2 || 0.3 || 0.8

References

1996 births
Living people
Fenerbahçe women's basketball players
Italian expatriate basketball people in Turkey
Italian expatriate basketball people in the United States
Italian women's basketball players
Minnesota Lynx players
People from Broni
Small forwards
Sportspeople from the Province of Pavia
Undrafted Women's National Basketball Association players